Balappa Bhimappa Chimmanakatti is a politician from the state of Karnataka. He is a leader of Indian National Congress. He won as MLA in 2013 from Badami assembly constituency. In 2018 assembly elections, then Chief Minister Siddaramaiah contested elections from Badami and hence Chimmanakatti did not contest.

Career 
He has been the MLA of Badami in 1978, 1983, 1994, 1999 and 2013. He is the founder of Shri Kalidasa educational society in Badami, Bagalkot district.

References

Indian National Congress politicians
People from Karnataka
People from Bagalkot
People from Bagalkot district
Living people
Year of birth missing (living people)
Indian National Congress politicians from Karnataka